The Armistice of Copenhagen of 1537 ended the Danish war known as the Count's Feud. No formal peace was signed but the Swedish debt to Lübeck was considered settled, and the trade monopoly of Lübeck in Sweden came to an end.

History of Lübeck
Hanseatic League
Copenhagen
History of Copenhagen
1537 in Europe
1537 in Denmark